Malari in the Dhauli Ganga valley of the Nanda Devi Biosphere reserve is a small village near the Tibet border. This area has been declared as a world heritage site. Located 61 km from Joshimath, the nearest Tehsil, in Chamoli District of Uttarakhand.

"On the way to Malari we saw the fabled Dronagiri parvat from where Hanuman is believed to have procured Sanjivani, a plant to save the life of Lakshmana"(Ref:Himaranya - Ramananda Bharati). 

The villages in this valley include Reni, from where the Chipko movement of Garhwal was started; Gaura Devi, from where the famous chipko activist hailed, as well as Lata, Peng, Tolma, Surai, Phagti, Jamgavar, Kaga and Garpag. About 18 km from Malari, Niti is the last village in India, bordering Tibet. In times of yore, Niti Pass connected India and Tibet on the trade route. at that time, people use to trade goats, sheep, grains and other regular stuffs in exchange of Rock Salt and other Tibetan stuffs. Now, special permission has to be taken from the administration to go beyond Malari. The village has its own beauty in terms of nature and the residence pattern of people residing in the village. Malari is the Summer migration place for the villagers. The people of the village the 6 month migration pattern. They only live in the village during a period of 6 to 7 months i.e., from mid April to mid September or start of October. then they again migrate to their another place for winter migration. 

The population of Malari is 649 according to the 2001 census.  Male population is 318 and female population is 331.

References

 Population of Malari
 Reports of National Panchayat directory

Tourism in Uttarakhand
Cities and towns in Chamoli district